There are multiple classes of vessels known as Cape class:

 , 95-foot cutters built for the United States Coast Guard circa 1950
 , modified World War II freighters that served in the Royal Navy, Royal Canadian Navy, and Royal Netherlands Navy
 , 47 motor lifeboats first introduced into the Canadian Coast Guard in 1999
 , a class of large patrol boats operated by the Australian Border Force, Royal Australian Navy, and the Trinidad and Tobago Coast Guard
 Cape class, or capesize, cargo vessels too large to transit the Suez Canal

Ship classes